Zeeshan Abbasi (born July 12, 1982 Ayubia, Khyber Pakhtunkhwa) is a Pakistani blind cricketer who plays for the Pakistan blind cricket team in national and international matches. He is the captain of national team. Abbasi comes into the B2 category.

Career 
He has played twenty two One Day International matches and eleven T20 International matches. He made his international debut in 2000 as a left-arm fast bowler and a right-handed batsman.

Acid drinking 
During the T20 Blind Cricket World Cup in Bangalore, India Abbasi drank a full glass of acid (phenyl) after it was given to him during breakfast on December 8, 2012. Chairman of PBCC Sultan Shah said that the glass of acid was placed on the table deliberately. The next day he was pronounced as fit to play again in next matches of the tournament.

References

External links 
 Profile: Zeeshan Abbasi at the PBCC

1982 births
Living people
Pakistani cricket captains
Blind cricketers
Pakistani blind people
Cricketers from Islamabad
Pakistani disabled sportspeople